Christianity Magazine may refer to:
Christianity Magazine, a theology journal now published as Premier Christianity
Christianity Magazine (Churches of Christ), a defunct magazine produced by preachers in the non-institutional Churches of Christ in the United States